Dalbergia orientalis is a species of legume in the family Fabaceae.
It is found only in Madagascar.

References

Sources

orientalis
Endemic flora of Madagascar
Vulnerable plants
Taxonomy articles created by Polbot